Kattuthulasi is a 1965 Indian Malayalam-language film, directed by M. Krishnan Nair and produced by M. Kunchacko. The film stars Sathyan, Sharada, Adoor Bhasi Ushakumari and Manavalan Joseph. It was released on 10 July 1965.

Plot

Cast 
Sathyan
Sharada
Adoor Bhasi
Manavalan Joseph
Changanasseri Chinnamma
Bahadoor
K. S. Gopinath
Kottarakkara Sreedharan Nair
M. S. Namboothiri
Ushakumari

Soundtrack 
The music was composed by M. S. Baburaj and the lyrics were written by Vayalar Ramavarma.

References

External links 
 

1960s Malayalam-language films
1965 films
Films directed by M. Krishnan Nair
'Kattuthulasi1